Alfred Henry "Truck" Miller  (March 17, 1904 – December 20, 1967), also known as Al Miller, was a professional football player (halfback) who spent 1 season in the National Football League with the Boston Bulldogs in 1929. He was born in Boston, Massachusetts.,

He attended Worcester Academy (Class of 1923) and played college football at Harvard University (Class of 1927). Miller was one of the earliest Jewish players in the NFL.

Notes

Sources 
Worcester Academy
Roster of 1929 Boston Bulldog Players

Players of American football from Boston
Boston Bulldogs (NFL) players
Harvard Crimson football players
1904 births
1967 deaths
American football halfbacks
Worcester Academy alumni
Jewish American sportspeople
20th-century American Jews